Yusif Məmmədəliyev is a village in the municipality of Avaxıl in the Shamakhi Rayon of Azerbaijan. The village is named in honor of Dr. Yusif Mammadaliyev.

References

Populated places in Shamakhi District